Ahmed Nizam (born 17 May 1986) is an Indian cricketer. He is a left-handed batsman and a left-arm slow bowler who plays for Jammu and Kashmir. He was born in Bombay.

Nizam spent his youth cricketing career at Mumbai, playing for the Under-16s, the Under-19s and the Under-22s before entering into first-class cricket.

Nizam made his first-class debut for Jammu and Kashmir in November 2008.

References

External links

1986 births
Living people
Indian cricketers
Jammu and Kashmir cricketers